"In My Chair" is a single released by the British rock band Status Quo in 1970.

The song was written in an afternoon by Francis Rossi and Bob Young in Rossi's kitchen. The single was produced by John Schroeder.

It later appeared on numerous compilation albums, including Pictures – 40 Years of Hits.

The song has remained a regular feature of Status Quo live sets over subsequent decades, including their first live album in 1977.

Track listing
 "In My Chair" (Rossi / Young) (3.14)
 "Gerdundula" (Manston / James) (3.19)

Charts

References

External links
 Youtube.com video

Status Quo (band) songs
1970 singles
Songs written by Francis Rossi
Songs written by Bob Young (musician)
Song recordings produced by John Schroeder (musician)
1970 songs
Pye Records singles
Blues rock songs